Kénadsa is a town and commune in the Sahara Desert of south-western Algeria, and is the capital of Kénadsa District, Béchar Province. As of 2008, Kénadsa had a population of 13,492, up from 11,667 in 1998, and an annual growth rate of 1.5%.

There is a large longwave broadcasting station near Kénadsa.

Geography

Climate

Kénadsa has a hot desert climate (Köppen: BWh), with extremely hot summers and mild winters, and very little precipitation throughout the year.

Economy

Agriculture is an important industry in Kénadsa. There are a total of 67,000 date palms planted in the commune. As of 2009 there were 3,757 sheep, 4,592 goats, 1,507 camels, and 163 cattle. There were also 4000 chickens in 22 buildings.

There is some tourism in Kénadsa; attractions include sand dunes, palm groves, the old ksar and forts, and the dam across the Oued Meswar. Visitors to Kénadsa typically stay in Béchar since there are no hotels in Kénadsa.

There are also bituminous coal fields near Kénadsa. They were originally discovered in 1907, but mining activity did not begin until 1917. Output peaked in the 1940s and has declined since, due to competition from oil and gas fields in eastern Algeria. There are also deposits of lead, manganese and iron ore nearby, but these are largely unused.

Infrastructure and housing
100% of Kénadsa's population is connected to drinking water and to the sewerage system, 97% (including 2,707 buildings) have access to electricity. There are two fuel service stations in the town.

Kénadsa has a total of 2,613 houses, of which 2,142 are occupied, giving an occupation rate of 6.3 inhabitants per occupied building.

Transportation
Kénadsa lies on a local road connecting Méridja to the west with Béchar to the east.

Education
There are 4 elementary schools, with 65 classrooms including 48 in use. There are a total of 2,562 school students.

7.2% of the population has a tertiary education, and another 22.6% has competed secondary education. The overall literacy rate is 84.6%, and is 91.2% among men and 78.2% among women.

Health
Kénadsa has 5 room care facilities and a maternity ward; for other health care residents must travel to Béchar.

Culture
Kénadsa has a cinema with 350 seats.

Notable authors born in Kénadsa include Yasmina Khadra, Malika Mokeddem, and Pierre Rabhi.

Religion
Kénadsa has 3 operational mosques, with another 2 under construction.

Localities
The commune is composed of three localities:

Kenadsa
Barrage Djorf Torba
Masky

References

Neighbouring towns and cities

Communes of Béchar Province